Sequita Hemingway (born 7 January 1982) is a New Zealand professional boxer, rugby league and rugby union player. She is of Māori descent and identifies as a member of the Ngāti Tūwharetoa and Ngāi Tūhoe iwi.

Hemingway peaked in the world rankings when she reached third in the WBA, first in the IBO, and fourth on BoxRec.

Professional boxing career

Debut against World Ranked boxer 2021 
Filipo Saua out of Snap Back Boxing is Hemingways trainer since making her professional debut. Hemingway made her professional debut against world ranked boxer Alrie Meleisea. Before making her professional debut, she had only a few corporate fights with no amateur experience. Hemingway won the fight by majority decision which was considered a massive upset. After the fight, it was reported that Hemingway was in line for a New Zealand title. On July 23, 2021, it was announced that Hemingway would compete at New Zealand's largest rugby stadium, Eden Park. Due to the COVID-19 pandemic the event was postponed to 29 April 2022 and ended up being held at ABA Stadium.

Lani Daniels 2022 
Hemingway took on former world title challenger Lani Daniels. She suffered her first loss against Daniels, losing by unanimous decision. Hemingway was originally scheduled to fight Daniels again in a rematch for a New Zealand title, however, due to injury Hemingway had to pull out of the fight. In July 2022, Hemingway received her first major world ranking where she was ranked 6th with the WBA in the Light Heavyweight division, which is WBA's version of the Heavyweight division.

Double Rematches 2022 - 2023 
In October 2022, it was announced that a rematch would happen between Meleisea and Hemingway in December for the vacant Pro Box NZ New Zealand National heavyweight title. At this time Hemingway is ranked 3rd in the WBA. The winner of the Meleisea vs Hemingway fight would potentially lead to either a world title fight or at least a world title eliminator. Leading into the fight, Hemingway had a 12 week training camp to prepare for her fight against Meleisea. Meleisea won the fight by unanimous decision, making her a two time New Zealand heavyweight champion. Hemingway stated she be interest in either a rematch with Meleisea or a fight against Nailini Helu. In January 2023, it was announced that negotiations were happening to have a rematch with Lani Daniels. On 14 January, the fight was confirmed and will be for the ANBF Australasian Heavyweight title. On March 10th, Daniels won the fight against Hemingway by unanimous decision, wining the ANBF Australasian Heavyweight title.

Boxing awards 
 New Zealand Boxing Awards
 Upset of the year (Won)
 Debut of the year (Won)
 Female Newcomer of the year (Won)
 Rugby Boxer of the year (Won)

Professional boxing records

Rugby career

Rugby league 
Hemingway made her rugby league debut with Linton Cobras in Wellington. In this time, her team won the Wellington regional title twice in a row. She joined the Mid Central Vipers in 2016.

Rugby union 
Before she made her debut with Farah Palmer Cup team Manawatu Cyclones, she came from the local rugby club Kia Toa RFC. Hemingway made the selections for Manawatu Cyclones for the 2017, 2018, and 2019 seasons.

Personal life 
Hemingway is of Māori descent, and affiliates to Ngāti Tūwharetoa and Ngāi Tūhoe.

References 

1982 births
Living people
New Zealand women boxers
New Zealand Māori sportspeople
Heavyweight boxers
Rugby union players from the Hawke's Bay Region
New Zealand female rugby league players
New Zealand female rugby union players
Manawatu rugby union players
Sportspeople from the Hawke's Bay Region
Rugby league players from Hawke's Bay Region
Ngāti Tūwharetoa people
Ngāi Tūhoe people